Prerequisite or prerequisites may refer to:

 Prerequisite, a necessary condition for something
 Functional prerequisites, basic needs in sociological theory
 Prerequisite Tree in thinking processes
 Required prior courses or "prereqs", in a higher education curriculum

See also
 Make (software)#Rules and Makefile#Rules, prerequisites or dependencies of the target program